The Count of Évreux was a French noble title and was named for the county of Évreux in Normandy. It was successively used by the Norman dynasty, the Montfort-l'Amaury family, the Capetians as well as the House of La Tour d'Auvergne. The title is today used by Prince Michel, Count of Évreux, a member of the House of Orléans.

House of Normandy
989-1037 : Robert, Count of Évreux, natural son of Richard I, Duke of Normandy;
1037-1067 : Richard, Count of Évreux, son of the above;
1067-1118 : William, Count of Évreux, son of the above;

House of Montfort-l'Amaury
1118-1137 : Amaury I, nephew of William, Count of Évreux
1137-1140 : Amaury II, son of the above;
1140-1181 : Simon, brother of the above;
1181-1182 : Amaury III, son of the above;
1182-1195 : Amaury IV, son of the above;

In 1195, the county became the property of John of England. Amaury IV was later created the Earl of Gloucester

House of Capet
1298-1319 : Louis d'Évreux, brother of Philip IV of France;
1319-1343 : Philip III of Navarre
1343-1378 : Charles II of Navarre
 Confiscated by Charles V of France
1387-1404: Charles III of Navarre
 Exchanged for the newly-created Duchy of Nemours

House of Stewart
1427-1429 : John Stewart of Darnley

House of Brezé
1441-1465 : Pierre de Brézé

House of Valois
1569-1584 : Francis, Duke of Anjou

House of La Tour d'Auvergne
1605-1652 : Frédéric Maurice de La Tour d'Auvergne (never used title)
1641-1721 : Godefroy Maurice de La Tour d'Auvergne (never used title)
1668-1730 : Emmanuel Théodose de La Tour d'Auvergne (never used title)
1679-1753 : Louis Henri de La Tour d'Auvergne
1753-1771 : Charles Godefroy de La Tour d'Auvergne (never used title)
1771-1792 : Godefroy de La Tour d'Auvergne
1792-1802 : Jacques Léopold de La Tour d'Auvergne (titular)

House of Orléans
1941–Present : Michel d'Orléans, Prince of Orléans, son of Henri d'Orléans, Count of Paris.

House of Orléans
House of Capet
La Tour d'Auvergne
 

it:Contea di Évreux